Myriactis is a genus of flowering plants in the tribe Astereae within the family Asteraceae.

 Species

References

Asteraceae genera
Astereae